INS Palan is self-propelled fuel carrier built by Rajabagan Dockyard (RBD) (then owned by Central Inland Water Transport Corporation) for the Indian Navy. It was delivered in June 1986 at a cost of ₹5.719 million.

Specifications
Length: 58 m
Beam: 9.1 m
Draught: 3.1 m
Displacement: 1200 tons
Top Speed: 12 knots
Engine: 2 Kirloskar MAN diesels, 1 propeller 1440 bhp
Gross Tonnage: 624 tons
Dead Weight Tonnage: 715 tons

References

1986 ships
Auxiliary ships of the Indian Navy